The IFMA World Muaythai Championships are annual amateur muaythai competitions organised by the International Federation of Muaythai Amateur (IFMA), which is the sport governing body. Alongside the World Games muaythai programme, it is the highest level of competition for the sport.

Individual events

Senior Championships

Youth Championships

References

 
World championships in Muay Thai
Recurring sporting events established in 1994